Beachwood may refer to:

Places 
 Beachwood, New Jersey, a borough in Ocean County, New Jersey, United States
 Beachwood, Ohio, a city in Cuyahoga County, Ohio, United States
 Beachwood Canyon, Los Angeles, a community in California, United States

Buildings 
 Beachwood City Schools, a public school system in Beachwood, Ohio, United States
 Beachwood Place, a mall in Beachwood, Ohio, United States

Other uses
 Beachwood Sparks, an American alternative rock band
 Beachwood Sparks (album), the debut album by Beachwood Sparks
 The Beachwood Reporter, a Chicago-based Web publication

See also 
 Beach
 Beechwood (disambiguation)